Rayenda Union is a Union parishad of Sarankhola Upazila, Bagerhat District in Khulna Division of Bangladesh. It has an area of 87.28 km2 (33.70 sq mi) and a population of 34,495.

References

Unions of Sarankhola Upazila
Unions of Bagerhat District
Unions of Khulna Division